Gryunfeld or Gryunfel’d may refer to:
Həsənsu, Azerbaijan
Vurğun, Azerbaijan